Alberto Berasategui was the defending champion but lost in the first round to Mikael Tillström.

Félix Mantilla won in the final 6–7(5–7), 6–4, 6–3 against Hernán Gumy.

Seeds
A champion seed is indicated in bold text while text in italics indicates the round in which that seed was eliminated.

  Carlos Moyá (quarterfinals)
  Carlos Costa (first round)
  Alberto Berasategui (first round)
  Francisco Clavet (second round)
  Tomás Carbonell (quarterfinals)
  Hernán Gumy (final)
  Filip Dewulf (first round)
  Karim Alami (first round)

Draw

References
 1996 Oporto Open Draw

Singles
Singles
1996 in Portuguese tennis